February ( or Khumphaphan) is a 2003 Thai romance-drama film, written and directed by Yuthlert Sippapak.

Plot
The plot involves a young Thai woman with a terminal illness who goes to New York City to live her final months, is hit by a car and then develops amnesia, forgetting that she's in need of medical care. The man who run her over is part of a drug syndicate, and ever since the accident their lives intertwine.
The drug dealer wishes to escape his evil life. However, his boss has his passport and will not allow him to exit the country as he wants him to do more jobs.

Cast
 Sopitnapa Dabbaransi as Kaewta 
 Chakrit Yamnam as Jeeradech

External links
 

2003 films
2000s English-language films
Thai-language films
Films set in New York City
2003 romantic drama films
Thai romantic drama films